McLintock may refer to:

Surname
Alex McLintock (1853–1931), also known as Sandy McLintock, Scottish international footballer
Alexander Hare McLintock (1903–1968), New Zealand teacher, university lecturer, historian and artist
David McLintock (1930–2003), British scholar and translator of German literature
Frank McLintock (born 1939), former Scotland international footballer and football manager
Tom McLintock, former Scottish professional footballer
William McLintock (disambiguation), several people

Other
 McLintock!, 1963 American western with strongly comedic elements
 McLintock baronets, title in the Baronetage of the United Kingdom